The 27th Lumières Awards ceremony, presented by the Académie des Lumières, took place on 17 January 2022 to honour the best in French-speaking cinema of 2021. The ceremony was hosted by Laurie Cholewa for the fourth time.

Drama film Happening won the Best Film. Musical psychological drama film Annette garnered the most trophies with three awards.

Winners and nominees

The nominations were announced on 10 December 2021. Drama film Lost Illusions led the nominees with five nominations. Winners are listed first, highlighted in boldface, and indicated with a double dagger.

Films with multiple nominations and awards

See also
47th César Awards
11th Magritte Awards

References

External links
 

Lumières
Lumières
2022 in Paris
January 2022 events in France
Lumières Awards